Wei Chen (born February 22, 1986) is a Chinese pop singer and actor, who rose to fame through televised singing competition Super Boy.  He is probably best known through his album Disparate and his role as Ye Shuo in television series Meteor Shower.

In 2020 he announced his marriage with Yu Wei.

Early life
Wei was born on February 22, 1986. He grew up in Lanzhou, Gansu. In high school, he started having vocal music and piano lessons and later attended the Sichuan Conservatory of Music. As a professional musician, he is also accomplished at piano, guitar, hulusi, guxun.

Wei Chen participated in the 2007 season of Super Boy, a famous national televised singing competition in China, and placed third. In the competition, Wei's contagious performances and sunny image had won him much attention.

Career
In 2007, after Super Boy, Wei released his first extended play Optimist and held his first solo concert.

In 2008, Wei made his acting debut in the film Seventeen, starring Joan Chen and Sam Chow. The same year, he starred in the musical Struggle, based on the popular youth drama of the same name.

In 2009, he starred in the television series Meteor Shower as one of the leads. The drama was a commercial success and launched Wei to fame. The same year, he starred in the musical film China Idol Boys.

In 2010, Wei released his first full album Disparate. The album was met with commercial success, reaching number 1 on numerous Chinese music charts. He reprised his role in the sequel of Meteor Shower, which was met with success.

In 2011, Wei began hosting the variety show Great Sunday. In August, Wei collaborated with Lee Joon and Thunder of MBLAQ on the single "Run Away", and performed on the Korean music program M! Countdown. His third album, Daybreak was released on October 10.

In 2012, Wei held his second solo concert, My Way in Beijing.
His fourth album V Space was released on October 15, 2012. His fifth album, Pinnacle was released on August 21, 2013. His title song "Cover the Lover" featured Hannah Quinlivan as the lead actress.

In 2014, Wei co-starred in the youth film  Fleet of Time. His sixth album Hat Trick was released on December 12 with him acting as the executive producer of the album.

In 2015, Wei established his personal studio. His seventh album Day Dreamer was released on December 21. He then held the eponymous titled concert tour which wrapped up in Beijing on October.

In 2016, Wei co-starred in the crime thriller Lost in White as an important character. His eighth album Journey was released on December 25 to mark his tenth anniversary since debut. The same year he was cast in the war film A Fangirl's Romance as a general.

In 2017, Wei joined the cast of drama film Midnight Diners. In September, Wei embarked on his Journey arena concert to mark his tenth anniversary.

In 2018, Wei focused on acting. He first joined the cast of the war film The Eight Hundred directed by Guan Hu, and was cast in the military television series Anti-Terrorism Special Forces III.

Filmography

Film

Television series

Stage
 Struggle, 2008-2009

Discography

Albums

Singles

References

External links
Official Blog 
Official Weibo
Sina Entertainment
Music Asia

1986 births
Living people
People from Lanzhou
Chinese male film actors
Chinese male television actors
Chinese male stage actors
Singers from Gansu
Male actors from Gansu
Super Boy contestants
21st-century Chinese male actors
Participants in Chinese reality television series